Molon Khan, born Tögüs Mengke, (1437–1466) was a khagan of the Northern Yuan dynasty, reigning from 1465 to 1466. He was the eldest son of Taisun Khan.

Reign 
Molon Khan succeeded his younger brother Mahakörgis Khan in 1465 and it was prophesied "By you the great people will regain strength in legal order. Ascend to throne as Khaan". But he met the same fate as his younger brother: due to lack of real power, he was killed by warring Mongol nobles who fought each other for dominance.  After his death, the position of Great Khan remained vacant for nearly a decade as warring Mongol clans fought each other for power, and it was not until 1475 that the next khan, Manduul Khan, the uncle of Molon was crowned.

See also
 List of khans of the Northern Yuan dynasty

References

1437 births
1466 deaths
Northern Yuan rulers
15th-century Mongol rulers
15th-century Chinese monarchs